2016 was a leap year. It may also refer to:
2016 (number), a composite number
2016 (2010 film), a Ghanaian science fiction film
2016: Obama's America, a 2012 American documentary film

See also